Mount Buckley is an ice-free peak,  high, which is the central and highest summit of Buckley Island, a mountain massif at the head of Beardmore Glacier. It was discovered by the British Antarctic Expedition, 1907–09, and named for George Buckley of New Zealand, a supporter of the expedition.

Further reading 
 David J. Cantrill, Imogen Poole, The Vegetation of Antarctica Through Geological Time, P 8
 M.J. Hambrey, P.F. Barker, P.J. Barrett, V. Bowman, B. Davies, J.L. Smellie, M. Trantern, Antarctic Palaeoenvironments and Earth-Surface Processes, P 68
 Nicholas O'Flaherty, Finding the oldest forest fossils in Antarctica - 280 million years old!, 1 February 2018

External links 

 Mount Buckley on USGS website
 Mount Buckley on the Antarctica New Zealand Digital Asset Manager website
 Mount Buckley on SCAR website

References 
 

Mountains of the Ross Dependency
Shackleton Coast